Future Funk is a live album released in 1982 by the Washington, D.C.-based go-go band Experience Unlimited.

Critical reception
The Washington Informer wrote: "Side Two is given over to 'Crankin' At The Go Go'. This is the E.U. groove -- nineteen minutes and eighteen seconds of it. Long form, tongue-in-cheek, big fun funk, its raison d'etre is that 'everybody got to do the do.' You know ... the 'do' ... the 'freaky deak' ... Anyway 'Crankin ...' is definitely for pumping up the dance floor."

Track listing

Side A
"Wind It On Up" – 6:04
"Future Funk" – 6:38
"Tell Me Why" – 3:13

Side B
"Crankin' at the Go-Go" – 19:38

Personnel
 Gregory "Sugar Bear" Elliott – lead vocals, bass guitar
 Ivan Goff – keyboards
 Kent Wood – keyboards
 Ricky “Sugarfoot” Wellman – drums
 Genairo "Foxxy" Brown Foxx – congas, percussions
 Timothy "Short Tim" Glover – percussions
 Valentino "Tino" Jackson – electric guitar
 Darryel "Tidy Boy" Hayes – trumpet
 Michal "Go Go Mike" Taylor – trombone

References

External links
 Future Funk at Discogs

1982 live albums
Experience Unlimited albums